Ross O'Hennessy (born 1974) is a Welsh actor. He is best known for his role of  Lord of Bones in Game of Thrones.

He played roles in Hollyoaks Later, Da Vinci's Demons, The Musketeers, and playing the blood thirsty role of Sir Locke in Kurt Sutter's international television series The Bastard Executioner.

In 2015, he replaced Edward Dogliani as Lord of Bones in Season 5 of the HBO series Game of Thrones. Since appearing in Game of Thrones Ross O'Hennessy has been cast to play the vicious character of Carnage Cliff in the feature film adaption of the comic book Accident Man.

Early life

O'Hennessy was born into a working class Welsh family but by the age 16 knew he wanted to spend his time acting. At the age of 18 he left Wales and moved to London to chase his career. He was accepted into the National Youth Theatre, where he was tutored by actor Hakeem Kae-Kazim and performed in Maggie May, The Tempest and Macbeth in London. From these plays Ross won a scholarship from Sir John Mills and The Stage newspaper which enabled him to attend a three-year acting course at the Mountview Academy of Theatre Arts.

Early career

O'Hennessy picked up a career in the theatre and gained his first appearance at Chichester Festival Theatre in a play called The Visit in which he acted opposite Hollywood actress Lauren Bacall which was directed by Terry Hands. With such a big production came a lot of attention for Ross and so he was asked the join The Royal Shakespeare Company where he performed in As You Like It directed by Steven Pimlott, Three Hours After Marriage directed by Richard Cottrell and Troilus and Cressida directed by Ian Judge.

Television and film appearances

O'Hennessy very quickly moved into the world of television and film with his first television appearance being as Cpl Dando on Soldier Soldier in 1995 to 1997. He continued to work as a typical television jobbing actor until he got his big break in 2011 playing the role of Bruce Maverick in Hollyoaks Later. He was asked to play the role of Commander Quattrone in Da Vinci's Demons. having played this powerful role in such a big budget production allowed O'Hennessy to move into performances like Rattle Shirt - The Lord of Bones in Game of Thrones.

O'Hennessy has completed work in 2015 on the BBC Musketeers and has begun working on Kurt Sutter's new show all about the medieval times. O'Hennessy plays Sir Locke in this new FX production called The Bastard Executioner.

Charity Work
O'Hennessy is an active supporter of the arts and took part in a charity campaign to save his local theatre where he first started acting at the age of 15. O'Hennessy hosted a 'Game of Thrones' event where he came to auction Game of Thrones memorabilia and photos. He hosted a charity signing plus a question and answer session. The theatre was successful in its campaign and the Blackwood Little theatre was saved.

Personal Appearances 

O'Hennessy made his first fan based personal appearance at the Wrexham Comic Con event in November 2015.

Filmography

Film

Television

References

External links

 Ross O'Hennessy - Official Webpage

Welsh male television actors
Welsh male film actors
21st-century Welsh male actors
Living people
1974 births